Valery Popov may refer to:

 Valery Popov (diplomat), Soviet and Russian diplomat and ambassador
 Valery Popov (writer), Soviet and Russian writer
 Valery Popov (musician), Soviet bassoonist